Jewish Young Men's and Women's Association is a historic Jewish community center building located at Rochester in Monroe County, New York. It was constructed in 1931–1935 and is a complex of three connected buildings: an administration building, an auditorium / theater, and a handball court building. The buildings are of steel frame and reinforced concrete construction with exterior walls of brick veneer.  The buildings feature Colonial Revival style details.

It was listed on the National Register of Historic Places in 1985.

References

Jewish Men

Buildings and structures in Rochester, New York
Clubhouses on the National Register of Historic Places in New York (state)
Colonial Revival architecture in New York (state)
Buildings and structures completed in 1931
Jewish community organizations
National Register of Historic Places in Rochester, New York